Maestro Valderas was a Roman Catholic prelate who served as the Archbishop of Santo Domingo (1647–1648).

Biography
Maestro Valderas was ordained a friar in the Order of the Blessed Virgin Mary of Mercy. In 1647, he was selected by the King of Spain and confirmed by Pope Innocent X as Archbishop of Santo Domingo. He served as Archbishop of Santo Domingo until his resignation in 1648.

References

External links and additional sources
 (for Chronology of Bishops) 
 (for Chronology of Bishops) 

Year of birth unknown
Year of death unknown
Roman Catholic archbishops of Santo Domingo
Bishops appointed by Pope Innocent X
Mercedarian bishops
17th-century Roman Catholic archbishops in the Dominican Republic